Dil Tera Aashiq is a 1993 Indian Bollywood romantic comedy film directed by Lawrence D'Souza. The film stars Salman Khan and Madhuri Dixit in pivotal roles. This film is loosely based on the 1892 American play Charley's Aunt. The film released on 22 October 1993 along with another Salman Khan starrer Chandra Mukhi.

Synopsis 
Thakur Ranvir Singh Chaudhary (Anupam Kher) is a rich and influential man in his town. He doted on his only sister Radha but never forgave her for marrying a poor man. After Radha's death, the responsibility of looking after the children, Vijay (Salman Khan), Bittu and Gudiya falls on his shoulders. Soniya (Madhuri Dixit) is a young girl desperately looking for a job to support her sick mother. She decides to masquerade as an elderly woman Savitri Devi (Madhuri Dixit) to get the job of a governess for Bittu and Gudiya. She also starts working as a dance instructor to earn extra money. Vijay teaches at the same school and the two fall in love. Meanwhile, Thakur, a confirmed bachelor, is also drawn towards Savitri Devi. His friend Naseeb Kumar (Kader Khan) helps him in his efforts to win Savitri Devi's affection.

Pratap Singh is a dishonest businessman whose factory was shut down by Thakur. He tries to force Thakur into signing the papers that will enable him to reopen his factory. He finds out about Sonia's secret and tries to blackmail her to get Thakur's signature. His move fails and Sonia tells Vijay and Naseeb Kumar everything. Pratap then makes an anonymous phone call to Thakur and tells him about Sonia's secret and how Vijay and Kumar are in on it. Thakur finds the papers that Pratap gave Sonia in Savitri Devi's cupboard and believes that they were all trying to trick him. He confronts them and throws them out of his house without giving them a chance to explain. Pratap then kidnaps Thakur. But Vijay, Sonia, and Kumar rescue him and are reunited in the end. However this film has an incomplete ending when Vijay recovers from the bullet shot in his arm, comes home to meet his ma ma uncle Takur at home Takur realizes that his behavior towards his sister was wrong and meets Vijay and embraces him and asked him about Sonia where is Sonia he says and then the ending credits are shown. Movie is available on YouTube to watch.

Cast 
Salman Khan as Vijay Singh
Madhuri Dixit as Sonia Khanna / Savitri Devi  Old Lady
Anupam Kher as Thakur Ranbir Singh Chaudhary
Kader Khan as Naseeb Kumar
Anil Kapoor as himself
Asrani as Natwar Lal
Tej Sapru as Pratap Singh
Shakti Kapoor as Black Eye
Mangal Dhillon as Mr James, Black Eye's Henchman
Deepak Tijori as Announcer
Guddi Maruti as Passenger in train
Anjana Mumtaz as Mrs. Khanna
Piloo Wadia as Mrs. Lobo
Raja Duggal as Household Servant

Soundtrack

Rakesh Budhu of Planet Bollywood gave the album 8.5 stars stating, "Nadeem-Shravan have always had the touch for making these romantic soundtracks work, Dil Tera Aashiq is another contribution to the shine on the crown of melody kings". 'Dil Tera Aashiq' was the most popular song of the film.

References

External links

1993 films
1990s Hindi-language films
Films scored by Nadeem–Shravan
Films directed by Lawrence D'Souza